Little Plum (full name revealed to be Little Plum Stealing Varmint) is a British humoristic western comics series about a little Native American, originally created by Leo Baxendale and published in the magazine The Beano.

Concept

The eponymous hero and his friends Chiefy, Little Peach, Pimple and Hole-in-um-Head are members of the "Smellyfeet" American Indian tribe, who spend much of their time clashing with their rivals the "Puttyfeet" tribe. Other characters include Dr. Kildeer (the tribal medicine-man), Treaclefoot (Plum's faithful horse) and Pudding Bison (a 'marvellous' creature who eats anything – also featuring in spin-off strips Baby Face Finlayson and The Three Bears).

Character history

Original run (1953–1998)
Leo Baxendale created Little Plum in 1953 as a puny cartoon character in a dangerous cartoon world. It first appeared in issue 586, dated 10 October 1953. The comic strip employed a caricature of English language spoken by American Indians, notably replacing the word "the" with "um". Baxendale dreamed him up claiming he was a mixture of Hiawatha and Dennis the Menace and gave him into the editing team. Unsure of the name, Baxendale gave it in to the then Beano editor under the working title 'Booster' before the strip was officially titled 'Little Plum, Your Redskin Chum' . They consisted of Plum, a ten-year-old member of the Smellyfoot tribe and the misadventures he got up to trying to prove himself a valuable member. After Baxendale left The Beano in 1962, Robert Nixon drew a few strips before Ron Spencer took over that same year. The strip originally finished in 1986, but it continued to appear in the Beano annuals up to 1994, and reappeared for a short time in 1998 under the name 'The Legend of Little Plum', drawn by Tom Paterson.

Hunt Emerson strips and later history (2002 – 2015)
From 2002 it has returned again under its original name, drawn by Hunt Emerson. The strip was finally dropped in 2006 when Hunt Emerson started drawing Ratz, though he has since appeared in BeanoMAX and in the 2009 Beano Annual. In Issue 3566, Little Plum returned to the comic once again, as reprints of Hunt Emerson's strips. However, all uses of the word "um" present when the strips originally appeared were removed in the reprinted versions. In autumn 2012, a new feature launched in the Beano called Funsize Funnies, each page of which features four single line strips. One of these is Little Plum, drawn by Laura Howell. Some episodes are written and drawn by Andy Fanton, an ex-Dandy artist. Little Plum now features in The Beano every week in new full page strips drawn by Hunt Emerson and written by Claire Bartlett.

Other appearances
 Little Plum was parodied in adult comic Viz with their character "Little Plumber".

References

Beano strips
Humor comics
Western (genre) comics
British comics characters
1953 comics debuts
1986 comics endings
Comics characters introduced in 1953
Fictional Native American people
Native Americans in popular culture
Child characters in comics
Male characters in comics
Comics set in the United States